Zeytinburnu station is an under construction station in Zeytinburnu, Istanbul. The new platform will replace the 62 year old station opened in 1955. The original station was opened on 4 December 1955 as part of the Istanbul suburban commuter rail service between Sirkeci and Halkalı. Today it is part of the Marmaray suburban line.

References

Railway stations in Istanbul Province
Railway stations opened in 1955
1955 establishments in Turkey
Zeytinburnu